Joshua Matthew Rupe (born August 18, 1982) is an American former professional baseball relief pitcher. He played in Major League Baseball (MLB) for the Texas Rangers, Kansas City Royals, and Baltimore Orioles.

Career
Drafted by the Chicago White Sox in the 3rd round of the 2002 Major League Baseball Draft out of Louisburg College, Rupe was acquired by the Texas Rangers along with Frank Francisco and minor leaguer Anthony Webster to complete an earlier trade for Carl Everett in July 2003.

Early in the 2006 season, Rupe was placed on the 60-day disabled list due to an inflamed left elbow. Upon his recovery, he spent time rehabbing with the Triple-A Oklahoma RedHawks. He was recalled to the Rangers on July 28, 2006, and finished the season working out of the bullpen in a middle relief role.

Rupe failed to make the big league roster to start the 2007 season, and was optioned to the RedHawks. In 2008, Rupe made the major league roster and appeared in 46 games. He was granted free agency on November 9, 2009.

On November 25, 2009, Rupe signed a minor league deal with the Kansas City Royals. He made the Royals' 25 man roster, but on May 12, 2010, Rupe was designated for assignment.

He signed a minor league contract with the Baltimore Orioles in November 2010. He was later added to the 40-man roster before being designated for assignment on May 10, 2011.

On August 5, 2011 Josh Rupe was released by the Baltimore Orioles. He last played for the Somerset Patriots of the Atlantic League of Professional Baseball.

Personal
He is married to April Winfree Rupe and has two sons and a daughter.

References

External links

Minor League Splits and Situational Stats

1982 births
Living people
Texas Rangers players
Kansas City Royals players
Baltimore Orioles players
Baseball players from Virginia
Major League Baseball pitchers
Bristol White Sox players
Louisburg Hurricanes baseball players
Kannapolis Intimidators players
Clinton LumberKings players
Stockton Ports players
Spokane Indians players
Frisco RoughRiders players
Oklahoma RedHawks players
Arizona League Rangers players
Oklahoma City RedHawks players
Omaha Royals players
Norfolk Tides players
Somerset Patriots players
Sportspeople from Portsmouth, Virginia